The Aurkvaevane Cirques are a set of three cirques with moraine-covered floors, indenting the west side of Kvaevefjellet Mountain in the Payer Mountains of Queen Maud Land. They were discovered and plotted from air photos by the Third German Antarctic Expedition, 1938–39, and re-plotted from air photos and from surveys, and named, by the Sixth Norwegian Antarctic Expedition, 1956–60.

References
 

Cirques of Queen Maud Land
Princess Astrid Coast